The 2009–10 FIS Cross-Country World Cup was a multi-race tournament over the season for cross-country skiers. It was the 29th official World Cup season in cross-country skiing for men and women. The season started 21 November 2009 in Beitostølen, Norway and ended on 21 March 2010 in Falun, Sweden. The World Cup was organised by the FIS who also run world cups and championships in ski jumping, snowboarding and alpine skiing amongst others. A new website was created by the FIS for Cross-country skiing fan that was released the week of 16 November 2009.

Calendar 
Both men's and women's events tended to be held at the same resorts over a 2 or 3 day period. Listed below is a list of races which equates with the points table further down this page.

The Tour de Ski was a series of events which count towards the World Cup. This started in Oberhof and ended in Val di Fiemme.

Men

Women

Men's team

Women's team

Men's standings

Overall

Women's standings

Overall

Nations Cup

Points distribution
The table shows the number of points won in the 2009–10 Cross-Country Skiing World Cup for men and women.

A skier's best results in all distance races and sprint races counts towards the overall World Cup totals.

All distance races, included individual stages in Tour de Ski and in World Cup Final (which counts as 50% of a normal race), count towards the distance standings. All sprint races, including the sprint races during the Tour de Ski and the first race of the World Cup final (which counts as 50% of a normal race), count towards the sprint standings.

The Nations Cup ranking is calculated by adding each country's individual competitors' scores and scores from team events. Relay events count double (see World Cup final positions), with only one team counting towards the total, while in team sprint events two teams contribute towards the total, with the usual World Cup points (100 to winning team, etc.) awarded.

Achievements

First World Cup career victory

Men
, 24, in his 2nd season – the WC 1 (15 km F) in Beitostølen; also first podium
, 28, in his 10th season – the WC 6 (Sprint F) in Davos; first podium was 2003-04 WC 5 (Sprint C) in Val di Fiemme
, 27, in his 8th season – the WC 14 (10 km C) in Toblach; also first podium 
, 24, in his 4th season – the WC 20 (30 km Skiathlon) in Rybinsk; also first podium
 , 23, in his 4th season – the WC 23 (30 km Skiathlon) in Lahti; first podium was 2009-10 WC 5 (15 km F) in Davos
 , 37, in his 17th season – the WC 21 (15 km F) in Canmore; first podium was 1996-97 WC 8 (15 km F) in Hakuba
 , 24, in his 5th season – the WC 27 (Sprint C) in Stockholm; first podium was 2009-10 WC 2 (Sprint C) in Ruka

Women
, 20, in her 2nd season – the WC 4 (Sprint F) in Düsseldorf; also first podium 
, 25, in her 6th season – the WC 5 (10 km F) in Davos; first podium was 2009-10 WC 3 (10 km C) in Ruka
, 24, in her 6th season – the WC 19 (Sprint F) in Rybinsk

First World Cup podium

Men
, 24, in his 2nd season – no. 1 in the WC 1 (15 km F) in Beitostølen
, 27, in his 6th season – no. 2 in the WC 3 (15 km C) in Ruka
, 27, in his 8th season – no. 1 in the WC 14 (10 km C) in Toblach
, 24, in his 4th season – no. 1 in the WC 20 (30 km Skiathlon) in Rybinsk
 , 23, in his 4th season – no. 3 in the WC 5 (15 km F) in Davos

Women
, 25, in her 6th season – no. 2 in  the WC 3 (10 km C) in Ruka
, 20, in her 2nd season – no. 1 in  the WC 4 (Sprint F) in Düsseldorf
, 24, in her 6th season – no. 3 in  the WC 4 (Sprint F) in Düsseldorf

Victories in this World Cup (all-time number of victories as of 2009/10 season in parentheses)

Men
 , 9 (15) first places
 , 4 (15) first places
 , 4 (6) first places
 , 2 (2) first places
 , 1 (9) first place
 , 1 (7) first place
 , 1 (5) first place
 , 1 (3) first place
 , 1 (2) first place
 , 1 (2) first place
 , 1 (1) first place
 , 1 (1) first place
 , 1 (1) first place
 , 1 (1) first place
 , 1 (1) first place
 , 1 (1) first place
 , 1 (1) first place

Women
 , 9 (16) first places
 , 8 (39) first places
 , 4 (20) first places
 , 2 (7) first places
 , 2 (2) first places
 , 1 (6) first place
 , 1 (5) first place
 , 1 (4) first place
 , 1 (2) first place
 , 1 (2) first place
 , 1 (1) first place
 , 1 (1) first place

References 

2009-10 World Cup schedule, including Tour de Ski. - accessed 10 November 2009
FIS Cross-Country official website. - accessed 19 November 2009.

 
World Cup 2009-10
World Cup 2009-10
FIS Cross-Country World Cup seasons